Éder Marcelo Prudêncio (born May 14, 1980 in Maracaí), known as Éder Prudêncio or Éder Louco, is a Brazilian footballer who plays for CRB as midfielder.

Career statistics

References

External links

1980 births
Living people
Brazilian footballers
Association football midfielders
Campeonato Brasileiro Série B players
Campeonato Brasileiro Série C players
Campeonato Brasileiro Série D players
Clube de Regatas Brasil players
Mirassol Futebol Clube players
Marília Atlético Clube players
Associação Desportiva São Caetano players
Esporte Clube São Bento players